Maclear Hospital is a provincial government funded hospital for the Elundini Local Municipality area in Maclear, Eastern Cape in South Africa.

References
 Eastern Cape Department of Health website - Joe Gqabi District Hospitals

Hospitals in the Eastern Cape
Joe Gqabi District Municipality